Monique Bantégny (born 11 February 1940) is a French athlete. She competed in the women's pentathlon at the 1968 Summer Olympics.

References

1940 births
Living people
Athletes (track and field) at the 1968 Summer Olympics
French pentathletes
Olympic athletes of France
Sportspeople from Arras